The Angolan League was a political movement working for the interest of the native population of Portuguese colonial Angola. The organization was founded in 1912, directly after the proclamation of the Portuguese republic.

In 1922 the movement was banned.

Defunct political parties in Angola
Political parties established in 1912
Political parties disestablished in 1922
Portuguese Angola
1912 establishments in Angola